Music and Dance was an Australian television program. The four-part series aired in 1959, broadcast live on Melbourne station ABV-2, part of ABC (it is not known if it was also shown in Sydney). It aired fortnightly on Sundays. Archival status is unknown.

Overview
Each episode featured Latvian dancer Vija Vetra, who was living in Australia at the time. As the title of the series suggests, she danced, and was accompanied by Robert Wilson on the piano.

References

External links
Music and Dance at IMDb

1959 Australian television series debuts
1959 Australian television series endings
Dance television shows
Australian music television series
Black-and-white Australian television shows
English-language television shows
Australian live television series
Australian Broadcasting Corporation original programming